Finding water may refer to multiple techniques:

 Hydrology and hydrogeology, which study the movement and distribution of water in nature
 Use of a water detector, in a building
 Dowsing, a pseudo-scientific method
 Gamma ray spectrometry, a method of finding extraterrestrial water